Mamutčevo is a village in the municipality of Veles, North Macedonia.

Demographics
According to the 2002 census, the village had a total of 331 inhabitants. Ethnic groups in the village include:

Macedonians 331

References

External links

Villages in Veles Municipality
Albanian communities in North Macedonia